Angelini is a medium-sized private international group. Founded in Italy in the early twentieth century, the Angelini group has offices in 25 countries. Led by President Francesco Angelini, the industrial group employs approximately 3000 people.

The antidepressant medication Trazodone was developed in the 1960s by scientists at Angelini.

In a 2018 evaluation of firms' reputation issued by Reputation Institute, Angelini ranked 66th in general and second among life sciences companies.

In 2020, Angelini took over ownership of Thermacare after Pfizer spun off the transdermal analgesic patch after its merger with GlaxoSmithKline's consumer healthcare division.

In January 2021, the Swiss biotech company Arvelle Therapeutics was acquired for $960 million.

References

External links 

 Official Website Angelini Industries
 Official Website Angelini Pharma

Manufacturing companies based in Rome
Pharmaceutical companies of Italy
Personal care companies
Italian companies established in 1919
Multinational companies headquartered in Italy
Pharmaceutical companies established in 1919